Lamar is a census-designated place and unincorporated community in Benton County, Mississippi, United States. It is located along Mississippi Highway 7 in western Benton County. Lamar has a post office with the ZIP code 38642. The nearly abandoned Mississippi Central Railroad runs through Lamar, and is only used rarely for freight trafficking. Lamar shares its ZIP code with the nearby community of Slayden.

It was first named as a CDP in the 2020 Census which listed a population of 39.

History
Lamar was named in honor of Lucius Quintus Cincinnatus Lamar, author of the Mississippi Ordinance of Secession, Confederate diplomat and U.S. senator. Lamar was originally located in Marshall County, but after Benton County was created from Marshall County and Tippah County, the town was moved two miles east to be closer to the railroad. Lamar was formerly home to a school. A post office first began operation under the name Lamar in 1837.

Demographics

2020 census

Note: the US Census treats Hispanic/Latino as an ethnic category. This table excludes Latinos from the racial categories and assigns them to a separate category. Hispanics/Latinos can be of any race.

Notable person
 Floyd Lee, blues musician

References

Unincorporated communities in Benton County, Mississippi
Unincorporated communities in Mississippi
Census-designated places in Benton County, Mississippi